I was Dora Suarez, published in 1990, is a detective novel by Derek Raymond. It is the fourth book in the Factory series, following He Died with His Eyes Open, The Devil's Home on Leave, and How the Dead Live.

Plot summary
In the fourth novel in the Factory series opens, young prostitute Dora Suarez is axed into pieces. The killer then smashes the head of her neighbour, an 86-year-old widow. On the same night, a mile away in the West End, a shotgun blows the top off the head of Felix Roatta, part owner of the seedy Parallel Club. As the detective obsesses over the young woman whose murder he investigates, he discovers that her death is even more bizarre than he had suspected: the murderer ate bits of flesh from Suarez’s corpse and ejaculated on her thigh. Autopsy results compound the puzzle: Suarez was dying of AIDS, but the pathologist is unable to determine how she had contracted HIV. Then a photo, supplied by a former Parallel hostess, links Suarez to Roatta, and the detective's inquiries at the nightclub reveal her vile and inhuman exploitation.

Criticism
Cook’s notoriety crested following the 1990 publication of what many consider his best – and most repulsive – work: the tortured, redemptive tale of a masochistic serial killer, I Was Dora Suarez. To Cook’s delight, the ensuing novel caused Dan Franklin, the publisher of its three predecessors, to vomit over his desk. As a result of this reader response, Secker & Warburg told the author to take his nauseating wares elsewhere. Scribner took over the fourth novel in the factory series. Writing for The New York Times, Marilyn Stasio proclaimed, “Everything about I Was Dora Suarez...shrieks of the joy and pain of going too far.” Filmmaker Chris Petit described it in The Times as “a book full of coagulating disgust and compassion for the world’s contamination, disease and mutilation, all dwelt on with a feverish, metaphysical intensity that recalls Donne and the Jacobeans more than any of Raymond’s contemporaries.”

Cook recognized I Was Dora Suarez as his greatest but most onerous achievement: “Writing Suarez broke me; I see that now. I don’t mean that it broke me physically or mentally, although it came near to doing both. But it changed me; it separated out for ever what was living and what was dead. I realised it was doing so at the time, but not fully, and not how, and not at once. […] I asked for it, though. If you go down into the darkness, you must expect it to leave traces on you coming up — if you do come up. It’s like working in a mine; you hope that hands you can’t see know what they’re doing and will pull you through. I know I wondered half way through Suarez if I would get through — I mean, if my reason would get through. For the trouble with an experience like Suarez is that you become what you’re writing, passing like Alice through the language into the situation.” (The Hidden Files, pp. 132–133.)

Adaptations
Robin Cook read some excerpts of his novels in a live performance with background music by the alternative rock band Gallon Drunk.

1990 British novels
Novels set in London
Charles Scribner's Sons books